The Forever Story is the third studio album by American rapper JID. It was released on August 26, 2022, through Dreamville and Interscope Records. The album features guest appearances from Kenny Mason, EarthGang, 21 Savage, Baby Tate, Lil Durk, Ari Lennox, Yasiin Bey, Lil Wayne, Johntá Austin, Ravyn Lenae and Eryn Allen Kane.

Background 
The Forever Story was a highly anticipated project, as it marks JID's first solo output in almost four years, since the critically acclaimed DiCaprio 2 was released in 2018. Our Generation Music wrote: "With a forthcoming album that's been in the works for nearly a half decade, fans could ironically call the wait for JID's next project The Forever Story.'"

Conceptually, The Forever Story is a sequel to JID's debut album, The Never Story, released in 2017. The title is a direct reference to the 2017 album's title, and the artwork alludes to the 2017 album's artwork. The artwork depicts the rapper "standing in the middle of a crowd containing people from all walks of life", capturing "the different realities Black people face in America."

Recording and production
In March 2020, JID began working on the album at the Spillage Village studio house in Atlanta with members of the group expected make appearances. However due to the COVID-19 pandemic, they decided to record collectively for the album Spilligion. In an interview with, he told Billboard, "This next album [The Forever Story] is the best shit I've ever done in my life. Every step I've taken was worth it, and our blocks are building."

The album was executive produced by Barry "Hefner" Johnson, JID, and Christo. The production was mainly handled by Christo, Monte Booker, Kaytranada, James Blake, Thundercat, DJ Khalil, Childish Major, Groove, Tommy Brown and Cardiak, among others.

 Promotion and release 
JID began teasing his third studio album in 2019 through use of social media, but promotion did not begin until January 2022, when the lead single, "Surround Sound", was released. During his performance at Coachella in April 2022, he told the crowd he would announce the album release date during another performance the next week; however, he never ended up doing it. On August 9, 2022, he unveiled the album artwork and revealed that it would be released on August 26. A second single from the album, "Dance Now", was also released the same day. On August 19, JID released "2007"—a song which was originally meant to serve as the album's outro, but could not be included in the end due to problems with sample clearance—exclusively through YouTube. On August 22, he revealed the album tracklist, consisting of fifteen tracks. Two days before the release, JID hosted a promotional scavenger hunt event in three different US cities; he instructed fans that those who are able to locate a Pontiac G6 (a car JID used to own) will get to hear the album early. The album was officially released on August 26, 2022.

On November 2, 2022, JID announced that intended album outro "2007" would be released the following day, and on November 3, 2022, an extended version including the song was released to streaming services.

Music and lyrical themes
Prior to the release, JID commented on the album's themes and creation process: "Initially I wanted to create an album that serves as an origin story and speaks to who I am and what I came from. [...] This has been the heaviest project for me to make and I take pride in my vulnerability that came in the midst of creation." In an interview with Complex, JID spoke on why he wanted to include personal family stories in the album saying:

The original outro for the album, "2007", is a narrative-driven song that tells the story of JID's upbringing and college experience from an aspiring football player to a rapper. JID highlighted release dates of several albums as checkpoints to depict critical moments in his life, such as J. Cole's The Come Up, The Warm Up, and Cole World: The Sideline Story, Kendrick Lamar's Section.80, and his debut The Never Story. The song also includes skits from his father talking about when he found out JID was kicked out of college and decided to pursue rapping, and J. Cole telling the story about how they met and when he decided to sign him to Dreamville.

Critical receptionThe Forever Story was met with critical acclaim upon its release. At Metacritic, which assigns a normalised rating out of 100 to reviews from mainstream publications, the album received an average score of 83, based on 6 reviews.

Ben Broyd of Clash praised the album, saying “JID’s latest release is a wonderful insight into the rapper’s formative years, and ultimately through the introspective manner allows for an enthralling listen. Through ‘The Forever Story’ JID has claimed his seat at the prestigious table of Atlantan greats”. Writing for Pitchfork, Dylan Green called it “a sprawling and sometimes frustrating bridge between JID’s upbringing and his place within hip-hop canon and Black history at large”. In an anonymously written assessment for AllMusic, the reviewer claimed that it was "an album every bit as ambitious and monumental as the two solo studio outings that preceded it" and felt it demonstrated that JID was, "growing in terms of technical talent while also opening up more lyrically."

In a more mixed review for HipHopDX'', David Aaron Brake claimed that "the skills are there, it’s littered with flashy displays of technique and it sounds better than fine most of the time. But there’s nothing on the line: at the end of the day, it doesn’t matter who wins the game."

 Track listing Notes  signifies a co-producer
  signifies an additional producer
 "2007" features uncredited vocals by J. Cole, Ibrahim 'Ib' Hamad, and Carl Louis Route Jr.Sample credits "Raydar" contains a sample from "Mean Machine", written by Jalal Mansur Nuriddin, as performed by The Last Poets.
 "Dance Now" contains a sample from "Yoel's Niggun", written by Shlomo Gaisin, Zachary Goldschmiedt, and Elisha Mlotek, as performed by Zusha.
 "Crack Sandwich" contains uncredited samples from "Bliss", written and performed by Pete La Roca; and an uncredited interpolation of "Party Up (Up in Here)", written by Earl Simmons and Kasseem Dean, as performed by DMX.
 "Surround Sound" contains samples from "One Step Ahead", written by Charles Singleton and Eddie Snyder, as performed by Aretha Franklin.
 "Kody Blu 31" contains uncredited samples from "Funky Fanfare", written and performed by Keith Mansfield.
 "Sistanem" contains a sample from "Mary Go Round", written by Taalib Johnson, Osunlade, and Eric Roberson, as performed by Musiq Soulchild.
 "Can't Make U Change" contains a sample from "Body Heat", written by Quincy Jones, Leon Ware, Bruce Fisher, and Stanley Richardson, as performed by Jones.
 "Money" contains a sample from "I’d Like to Know You Better", written by Paul Coleman, as performed by Rasputin Stash.
 "Lauder Too" contains a sample from "Forever Yours", written by Leon Sylvers III and Edmund Sylvers, as performed by The Sylvers.
 "2007" contains a sample from "Let's Prove Them Wrong", written by Eddie Jones and George Kerr, as performed by Debbie Taylor; a sample from "Again", written by Dorcas Cochran and Lionel Newman, as performed by Doris Day; a sample from "Come, Listen to Me", written and performed by Gerry McClelland; and an uncredited sample from "HiiiPower", written by Kendrick Duckworth, Herbert Stevens, and Jermaine Cole, as performed by Kendrick Lamar.

PersonnelMusicians JID – vocals
 Reggie Ball Sr – additional vocals (track 1)
 Benji – background vocals (1, 2, 7), additional vocals (9, 11), bass guitar (7)
 Asiahn – background vocals (1)
 Eryn Allen Kane – background vocals (1), additional vocals (15)
 Fousheé – background vocals (3), additional vocals (9)
 Jesse Royal – spoken word (3)
 Bas – additional vocals (4)
 Christo – additional vocals (4), drums (7)
 Yuli – additional vocals (4)
 JD Beck – drums (5)
 Jean – additional vocals (7, 9, 11)
 Sheed – additional vocals (7, 9–11)
 Barbara Wilson – additional vocals (7)
 Hero the Band – additional vocals (7)
 Olu – additional vocals (7)
 Vonda Fuller – additional vocals (7, 10)
 Mustafa the Poet – spoken word (8)
 Justine Skye – additional vocals (9)
 Tane Runo – additional vocals (11)
 Emma Hathaway Delhomme – additional vocals (13)
 Kaden Chea – additional vocals (13)
 Maddison Williams – additional vocals (13)
 Randall Smith – additional vocals (13)
 Sunshine Hathaway Delhomme – additional vocals (13)
 Andrew Barnes – bass guitar (13)
 Jonathan Curry – drums (13)
 Russel Favret – guitar (13)
 Howard "GiveEmSoul" Joyner – keyboards (13)
 Juran Ratchford – saxophone (13)
 Cameron Tripp – trumpet (13)
 Angel White – additional vocals (14)
 Ravyn Lenae – additional vocals (15)
 Thundercat – bass guitar (15)Technical'''
 Nicolas "Dep" de Porcel – mastering
 Derek "MixedByAli" Ali – mixing
 Cyrus "NOIS" Taghipour – mixing (6), mixing assistance (1–5, 7–16)
 John Kadadu – engineering
 Curtis "Sircut" Bye – mixing assistance

Charts

Notes

References 

2022 albums
JID albums
Albums produced by Kaytranada
Albums produced by Cardiak
Albums produced by Thundercat (musician)
Albums produced by DJ Khalil
Albums produced by Khrysis
Dreamville Records albums
Interscope Records albums